The Maiden is a 2022 Canadian drama film, written and directed by Graham Foy. The film centres on a group of teenagers who have a supernatural experience that changes their lives while exploring a ravine.

The film was included in the Next Step incubator program for emerging filmmakers at the 2022 Cannes Film Festival, and in the First Cut+ program at the 2022 Karlovy Vary Film Festival. At Karlovy Vary, it won the €5,000 First Cut+ TRT Award.

It had its world premiere in the Giornate degli Autori program at the 2022 Venice International Film Festival, on September 1, 2022, and its North American premiere in the Contemporary World Cinema lineup at the 2022 Toronto International Film Festival.

Awards
At Venice, the film won the Cinema of the Future award.

The film was nominated for the John Dunning Best First Feature Award at the 11th Canadian Screen Awards in 2023.

References

External links

2022 films
2022 drama films
Canadian drama films
2020s English-language films
2022 directorial debut films
Films directed by Graham Foy
2020s Canadian films